C105 may refer to:
 Xingu corydoras, a species of South American Corydoras armoured catfish
 A subtype of Enterovirus C